Hardayal Public School is an English medium public school in Bahadurgarh, Haryana, India. The school was opened on 9 February 1998. It is affiliated with the Central Board of Secondary Education and its affiliation  number is 530304. The  principal is Mrs. Anuradha Yadav.  The HPS is situated on Main Najafgarh Road, Bahadurgarh-124507.

The school is named "hardayal" after the father in law and the architect" shri Hardayal Singh". Hardayal Public School owes its existence to the vision of Lt Rao Hardayal Singh. It was established in 1998 and is located in a four-acre campus on Najafgarh Road, Bahadurgarh.

References

www.hardayalpublicschool.com

 

Educational institutions established in 1998
Schools in Haryana
1998 establishments in Haryana